AK-27 or AK27 may refer to:

 Alexei Kovalev, ice hockey player
 , US Navy warship
 A formulation of red fuming nitric acid rocket fuel